Paris Lee (born April 20, 1995) is an American-born naturalized Cameroonian professional basketball player for Panathinaikos of the Greek Basket League and the EuroLeague. He played college basketball for Illinois State University. A  point guard, Lee was named the Missouri Valley Conference Player of the Year as a senior in the 2016–17 season.

Lee started his professional career with Antwerp Giants in Belgium in 2017. Lee had a successful season in 2018–19 as he reached the Basketball Champions League Final Four with Antwerp. Individually, he was named to the All-Champions League Second Team and was named the Pro Basketball League MVP.

High school career
Lee attended Proviso East High School in Maywood, Illinois, where he played for former National Basketball Association (NBA) player Donnie Boyce.

College career
 Lee earned a reputation as one of the top defensive players in the Missouri Valley Conference (MVC), earning All-Defensive team honors for three consecutive seasons. In his senior season, Lee led the Redbirds to a shared MVC title in a year dedicated to former associate head coach Torrey Ward, who had died unexpectedly in a plane crash on April 7, 2015. Lee averaged 13 points, 5 assists and 1.9 steals per game and at the conclusion of the season was named both the MVC Player of the Year and Defensive Player of the Year, the third player in league history to win both honors.

Professional career

Antwerp Giants (Belgium)
Following the close of his college career, Lee signed with the Antwerp Giants of the Belgian League. After averaging 13.8 points per game in four games of the Basketball Champions League’s Qualification Round, Lee signed a contract extension until 2020.

In the 2018–19 season, Lee played in the Basketball Champions League (BCL) with Antwerp. With Lee as starting point guard, Antwerp had a successful run to the Final Four which was hosted by Antwerp. The team ended in third place after defeating Brose Bamberg in the third place game. Lee was named to the All-Champions League Second Team. In the domestic Pro Basketball League, Lee was given the Most Valuable Player award.

Bamberg (Germany) 
On June 29, 2019, Lee signed a two-year contract with Brose Bamberg of the German Basketball Bundesliga. He followed his Antwerp coach Roel Moors, who signed with Bamberg earlier. Lee averaged 8.4 points and 5.8 assists per game. He was released by the team on July 15, 2020.

Orléans Loiret Basket (France) 
On July 15, 2020, he has signed with Orléans Loiret Basket of the French Jeep Elite.

AS Monaco (France) 
On July 14, 2021, Lee signed a one-year deal with AS Monaco of the French LNB Pro A and the EuroLeague.

Panathinaikos (Greece)
On July 1, 2022, Lee signed a two-year contract with Panathinaikos of the Greek Basket League and the EuroLeague. He started the season off well, by being a vital player in the team. On January 13, 2023, he scored 21 points in a 88–86 win over Maccabi Tel Aviv BC at OAKA.

National team career 
Lee became a naturalised Cameroonian citizen in 2022. On August 26, he made his debut for Cameroon in a 71–69 win over the DR Congo, scoring 15 points as the starting point guard.

Career statistics

EuroLeague 

|-
| style="text-align:left;"| 2021–22
| style="text-align:left;"| AS Monaco
| 36 || 9 || 19.3 || .398 || .353 || .863 || 1.4 || 2.4 || 1.1 || .0 || 7.2 || 7

Basketball Champions League

|-
| style="text-align:left;"| 2018–19
| style="text-align:left;" | Antwerp Giants
| 20 || 29.0 || .377 || .325 || .700 || 2.5 || 5.0 || 1.8 || .0 || 12.7
|-
| style="text-align:left;"| 2019–20
| style="text-align:left;" | Brose Bamberg
| 14 || 25.6 || .367 || .431 || .867 || 2.1 || 4.1 || .9 || .0 || 9.2
|}

References

External links

Illinois State Redbirds bio
College stats @ sports-reference.com

1995 births
Living people
American expatriate basketball people in Belgium
American expatriate basketball people in France
American expatriate basketball people in Germany
American expatriate basketball people in Greece
American men's basketball players
Antwerp Giants players
AS Monaco Basket players
Basketball players from Illinois
Brose Bamberg players
Illinois State Redbirds men's basketball players
Orléans Loiret Basket players
Panathinaikos B.C. players
Point guards
Sportspeople from Maywood, Illinois